The Super Coupe Roger Milla is a match competition in Cameroon football, played between the Cameroon Premiere Division champions and the Cameroon Cup winners.

Finals
1999 : Sable FC (Batié) 1-0 Canon Yaoundé (Yaoundé)
2000 : Kumbo Strikers FC (Kumbo) 1-0 Fovu Club   (Baham)
2001 : Fovu Club (Baham)  1-0 Coton Sport FC  (Garoua)
2002 : Mount Cameroon FC (Buéa) 2-0 Canon Yaoundé (Yaoundé) 
2019 : Stade Renard (Melong) 3-1 UMS de Loum (Loum) 
2022 : Bamboutos (Mbouda) 1-0 Cotonsport (Garoua) 

NB: in 2003 and 2004 Coton Sport FC won the league-and-cup double and apparently no Super Cup match was organised.

References

External links
Cameroon - List of Super Cup Finals, RSSSF.com

Cameroon
SuperCup